Ramón Echarren Istúriz (13 November 1929 – 25 August 2014) was a Roman Catholic bishop.

Ordained to the priesthood in 1958, Echarren Istúriz was appointed titular bishop of 'Diano' and auxiliary bishop of the Roman Catholic Archdiocese of Madrid, Spain, in 1969. In 1978, he was appointed bishop of the Roman Catholic Diocese of Canarias and retired in 2005.

Notes

1929 births
2014 deaths
20th-century Roman Catholic bishops in Spain
Spanish Roman Catholic titular bishops
21st-century Roman Catholic bishops in Spain
People from Vitoria-Gasteiz
Pontifical University of Salamanca alumni
Pontifical Gregorian University alumni
Catholic University of Leuven (1834–1968) alumni
Basque Roman Catholic priests